The Cecil Ferry is a cable ferry in the Canadian province of Saskatchewan east of Prince Albert, Saskatchewan.  The ferry crosses the North Saskatchewan River, providing a link between Saskatchewan Highway 302 and Saskatchewan Highway 55.

The six-car ferry is operated by the Saskatchewan Ministry of Highways and Infrastructure. The ferry is free of tolls and operates between 7:00 am and midnight, during the ice-free season.

Of all cable ferries in the province, the Cecil Ferry carries the highest percentage of truck traffic.  The ferry transports approximately 20,000 vehicles each year.

See also 
 List of crossings of the North Saskatchewan River

References 

Ferries of Saskatchewan
Cable ferries in Canada
Garden River No. 490, Saskatchewan
Prince Albert No. 461, Saskatchewan
Division No. 15, Saskatchewan